is a Japanese manga series written and illustrated by Naoko Moto. It was serialized in Princess magazine from 1998 to January 2007 and published as 20  volumes by Akita Shoten. Set during the Victorian era, the story follows the adventures of Bluebell Lily Everrose, nicknamed Bell, a young girl who travels to London to find a job as a governess.

Synopsis
When Bell comes to London, she hopes for a bright future. But fate plays a trick on her. While she is working for an unpleasant family, a dead body is found in her bag and she is arrested. Fortunately, she is rescued by the kind Mr. Noel Scott and Lady Ethel, whom she discovers later to be a man. After the incident, she comes across numerous events, which are either hilarious, dramatic, or romantic.

Characters
 
 Also known as Bell, she is from a rural area of England. Her father was a missionary. After he died, she travels to London to seek a job as a governess. She is lively, optimistic, and romantic.
  / 
 After a marquis's daughter died, his wife became heartbroken. The marquis tried to cure her heart by finding a child to replace their daughter. He found Argent Gray in East End, trained the young boy as a lady and replaced their daughter with him. With grace and beauty, Argent becomes the society's top lady. But he has another facet. Every now and then, he dresses as a man and goes by the name Argent Gray, which is also his pen name as a novelist for Noel's magazine. When he is in this mode, he acts as an uncouth man who grew up in a slum. That does not hide his exceptional beauty, however, since he has long, noticeable silver hair and a pretty face.
 
 He runs a publishing house and a magazine for ladies. He tried to propose to Bell but he got rejected.
 
 Lady Ethel's brother. After three years of studying outside of the country, Lord Martin came back to London. He first encountered Bell while she and her student went on a walk. Bell accidentally stomped on him.

References

Further reading

External links
 Lady Victorian at Akita Shoten 
 Lady Victorian at the Media Arts Database 

1998 manga
Akita Shoten manga
Comics set in England
Historical anime and manga
Romance anime and manga
Shōjo manga